Zuncich Hill is a broad, ice-covered hill (1,075 m) rising between the heads of Siemiatkowski Glacier and El-Sayed Glacier in Marie Byrd Land. It was mapped by the United States Geological Survey (USGS) from surveys and U.S. Navy aerial photos between 1959 and 1965, and was named by the Advisory Committee on Antarctic Names (US-ACAN) for Lieutenant Joseph L. Zuncich, U.S. Navy Reserve, an LC-130F Hercules aircraft navigator during Operation Deep Freeze 1968.

Hills of Marie Byrd Land